Basketball competitions at the 2022 Bolivarian Games in Valledupar, Colombia will be held from 24 June to 5 July 2022 at Coliseo Óscar Muñoz Oviedo.

Two medal events are scheduled to be contested: a boys' and women's tournaments. A total of 108 athletes (48 athletes–4 teams for men and 60 athletes–5 teams for women) will compete in the events. The boys' tournament is restricted to under-19 players while the women's tournament is an open competition without age restrictions..

Hosts Colombia are the defending gold medalists in both boys' and women's events.

Participating nations
A total of 7 nations (5 ODEBO nations and 2 invited) registered teams for the basketball events. Each nation was able to enter a maximum of 24 athletes (one team of 12 athletes per gender). Hosts Colombia and Venezuela will participate in both events. Bolivia and Panama will participate in the boys' tournament while Chile, Dominican Republic and Guatemala will participate in the women's tournament.

Medal summary

Medal table

Medalists

Venue
All matches in both events will be played at Coliseo Óscar Muñoz Oviedo which is part of the Centro de Alto Rendimiento Deportivo La Gota Fría in Valledupar. The Coliseo Óscar Muñoz Oviedo has a capacity for 900 people.

Boys' tournament

The boys' tournament will be held from 24–28 June 2022 and consists of a preliminary round (group stage) and a final round.

All match times are in COT (UTC−5).

Preliminary round
The preliminary round consists of a single group of 4 teams in which each team will play once against the other 3 teams in the group on a single round-robin basis, with all the 4 teams advancing to the semi-finals.

Final round
The final round consists of the semi-finals and the bronze and gold medal matches. The semi-finals match-ups are: 
Semifinal 1: Prel. round 2nd place v Prel. round 3rd place
Semifinal 2: Prel. round 1st place v Prel. round 4th place

Winners of semi-finals will play the gold medal match, while losers will play the bronze medal match.

Semi-finals

Bronze medal match

Gold medal match

Women's tournament

The women's tournament will be held from 1 to 5 July 2022 and consists of a preliminary round (group stage) and a final round.

All match times are in COT (UTC−5).

Preliminary round
The preliminary round consists of a single group of 5 teams in which each team will play once against the other 4 teams in the group on a single round-robin basis. The top two teams will advance to the gold medal match and teams placed third and fourth will play for the bronze medal.

Bronze medal match

Gold medal match

References

External links
Bolivarianos Valledupar 2022 Basketball

Basketball
Bolivarian Games
2022 Bolivarian Games
Sports at the Bolivarian Games